The Abbot of Dryburgh (later, Commendator of Dryburgh) was the head of the Premonstratensian community of canons regular of Dryburgh Abbey in the Scottish Borders. The monastery was founded in 1150 by canons regular from Alnwick Abbey with the patronage of Hugh de Morville, Lord of Lauderdale. In the 16th century the monastery increasingly came under secular control, and was eventually incorporated into the lordship of Cardross. The following is a list of abbots and commendators:

List of abbots

Notes

Bibliography
 Campbell, Archibald Lawrie, Annals of the Reigns of Malcolm and William, Kings of Scotland, A.D. 1153 – 1214
 Fawcett, Richard & Oram, Richard, Dryburgh Abbey, Stroud, 2005 
 Spottiswood, Liber S. Marie de Dryburgh, Bannatine Club, Edinburgh, 1847
 Watt, D.E.R. & Shead, N.F. (eds.), The Heads of Religious Houses in Scotland from the 12th to the 16th Centuries, The Scottish Records Society, New Series, Volume 24, (Edinburgh, 2001), p. 58-62

See also
 Dryburgh Abbey
 Lord of Cardross

People associated with the Scottish Borders
Premonstratensians
Scottish abbots
Lists of abbots